The Ambassador of Australia to Serbia is an officer of the Australian Department of Foreign Affairs and Trade and the head of the Embassy of the Commonwealth of Australia to the Republic of Serbia in Belgrade. The position has the rank and status of an ambassador extraordinary and plenipotentiary. The current ambassador, since October 2021, is Daniel Emery. The Ambassador also holds non-resident accreditation for the Republic of North Macedonia and for Montenegro.

Office history
Serbia and Australia have enjoyed official diplomatic relations since 26 April 1966, when Australia and the Socialist Federal Republic of Yugoslavia agreed to enter into formal diplomatic relations, with Australia opening an embassy in Belgrade in 1967. However, with the breakup of Yugoslavia in the early 1990s, Prime Minister Bob Hawke acted quickly to recognise the newly independent former Yugoslav Republics of Slovenia and Croatia in early 1992. Then subsequently the former republics of Bosnia and Herzegovina in May 1992 and Macedonia on 15 February 1994 were recognised. With these acts Australia maintained its relations with Yugoslavia, with Foreign Minister Gareth Evans stating: "We do continue to recognise what is left of Yugoslavia as Yugoslavia. Our mission in Belgrade will stay accordingly accredited to Yugoslavia and they'll be no change in the status of the Yugoslav mission here in Australia."

However, with the developing civil war in Yugoslavia and its former republics, Australia imposed sanctions on Yugoslavia and the Ambassador to the Federal Republic of Yugoslavia was recalled with a new ambassador not being appointed until 1997. The new ambassador, Noel Campbell, had served as Chargé d'affaires in Belgrade since May 1994, while he had been accredited as Ambassador to Romania since April 1992 and to the Republic of Macedonia since December 1995. From 1970 until 15 January 2014 the Ambassador in Belgrade was also accredited to Romania, when it was transferred to the Embassy in Athens. From 1972 to 1992 accreditation was also held for Bulgaria, until it was also transferred to the Embassy in Greece. From 1985, the Ambassador was also accredited to Albania, following the establishment of diplomatic relations on 15 September 1984, to 1992 when it was transferred to the Embassy in Rome. Yugoslavia became the Union of Serbia and Montenegro in February 2003 and with the independence of Montenegro in early 2006, the union dissolved and Australia recognised Montenegro on 27 June 2006 and transferred recognition of the former Union to the reconstituted Republic of Serbia, with non-resident accreditation to Montenegro from 1 September 2006.

List of heads of mission

Notes 
 Also served as non-resident Ambassador of Australia to the Republic of North Macedonia, since 15 February 1994.
 Also served as non-resident Ambassador of Australia to Montenegro, since 1 September 2006.
 Also served as non-resident Ambassador of Australia to Romania, from 1972 to April 1992.
 Also served as non-resident Ambassador of Australia to Albania, 15 September 1984 to 1992.

See also
Australia-Serbia relations
Foreign relations of Australia

References

External links
 Australian Embassy in Belgrade

 
 
 
 
 
 
 
Serbia
Australia